Theeßen is a former municipality in the Jerichower Land district, in Saxony-Anhalt, Germany. On 19 January 2008, it was incorporated into the town Möckern.

Former municipalities in Saxony-Anhalt
Möckern